Gnaphosa bicolor is a ground spider species found in Europe to Ukraine and Georgia.

See also 
 List of Gnaphosidae species

References 

Gnaphosidae
Spiders of Europe
Spiders of Georgia (country)
Spiders described in 1833